Tongue toast is a traditional open sandwich prepared with sauteed beef tongue and scrambled eggs. It is seasoned to taste with black pepper and onions. The tongue is sometimes served on buttered toast with a poached egg instead of a scrambled one. While it was primarily prepared as a dish for breakfast, it was also eaten for lunch and dinner.

A variant served for breakfast involved the use of boiled, smoked beef tongue, cream, scrambled egg, and seasoned to taste with nutmeg, pepper, chopped parsley, and chopped green peppers. A modern variant involved the use of reindeer tongue instead of beef tongue.

Tongue toast was also served as an hors d'oeuvre, prepared in a similar fashion to a French toast preparation, as a star-shaped appetizer stamped out of buttered toast with mustard butter added to it.

See also
 List of sandwiches
 List of toast dishes

References

Appetizers
Egg sandwiches
Tongue
Toast dishes
Food combinations
Beef sandwiches
Open-faced sandwiches
Offal sandwiches